Oklahoma City and surrounding suburbs are home to a variety of colleges and universities, including:

Public

Four-year
Langston University (Langston)
Oklahoma State University–Oklahoma City
University of Central Oklahoma (Edmond)
University of Oklahoma (Norman)
University of Science and Arts of Oklahoma (Chickasha)
University of Oklahoma Medical Center (Oklahoma City)

Two-year
Oklahoma City Community College
Redlands Community College (El Reno)
Rose State College (Midwest City)

Private
American Christian College and Seminary
DeVry University - Oklahoma City campus 
Downtown College Consortium
Heartland Baptist Bible College
Hillsdale Free-Will Baptist College (Moore)
Metropolitan College
Mid-America Christian University
Oklahoma Baptist College
Oklahoma Baptist University (Shawnee)
Oklahoma Christian University 
Oklahoma City University
Southern Nazarene University (Bethany)
Southwestern Christian University
University of Phoenix - Oklahoma City campuses

References

Oklahoma City, Oklahoma